Subha Srinivasan is an Indian-born cricketer who plays for the United Arab Emirates national cricket team. 
In July 2018, she was named in the United Arab Emirates' squad for the 2018 ICC Women's World Twenty20 Qualifier tournament. She made her WT20I debut against Netherlands on 7 July 2018.

Early and personal life
Srinivasan was born on 8 March 1980 in Chennai. Along with cricket, she gave complete importance to her studies and did B.Sc in Computer Science.

She is currently lives in UAE with her husband (R Srinivasan) and her two daughters, Akshaya and Akshara.

Domestic career
She was selected in the Madras Under-19 team.  At the age of 19 years, she was picked for the Tamil Nadu senior team.

Her first breakthrough came in 1999 when she took two (2) consecutive wickets and came close to a hat-trick in an All- India Senior Inter State South Zone match.

References

External links
 

Living people
1980 births
Cricketers from Chennai
Emirati women cricketers
United Arab Emirates women Twenty20 International cricketers
Indian emigrants to the United Arab Emirates
Indian expatriate sportspeople in the United Arab Emirates
Indian women cricketers
Sportswomen from Tamil Nadu
Tamil Nadu women cricketers